Koewarasan (Javanese : ꦏꦸꦮꦫꦱꦤ꧀ lit. meaning : "well-being") is a resort in Suriname, located in the Wanica District. Its population at the 2012 census was 27,713. It is located to the west of Paramaribo, and is mainly a suburban area. The municipality was founded in 1939, and was originally intended for the Javanese settlers from Java, however due to World War II, only a single group arrived. The majority of the population are East Indian. Prior to 1939, Koewarasan was an agricultural area used for the cultivation of rice.

Sunny Point
The Surinamese Interior War caused the population of Pokigron to flee. A large group of civilians squatted a terrain on Koewarasan, and have named their village, Sunny Point. A school has been setup by the organisation Kansrijk Suriname, and on 24 March 2018, a library opened. On 3 January 2019, 60 families living in Sunny Point-3 faced eviction.

Notable people
 Shahied Wagid Hosain (1962–2021), singer

References

Populated places in Wanica District
Resorts of Suriname
Squatting in Suriname